Dimitar Iliev may refer to:

 Dimitar Iliev (footballer, born 1988), Bulgarian football forward for Lokomotiv Plovdiv
 Dimitar Iliev (footballer, born 1986), Bulgarian football defender for Montana
 Dimitar Iliev (footballer, born 1999), Bulgarian football defender for Ludogorets Razgrad